Flakièdougou (also spelled Foulakédougou) is a village in north-eastern Ivory Coast. It is in the sub-prefecture of Laoudi-Ba, Bondoukou Department, Gontougo Region, Zanzan District.

Flakièdougou was a commune until March 2012, when it became one of 1126 communes nationwide that were abolished.

Notes

Former communes of Ivory Coast
Populated places in Zanzan District
Populated places in Gontougo